The 2006 Cincinnati Bearcats football team represented the University of Cincinnati in the 2006 NCAA Division I FBS football season. The team, coached by Mark Dantonio, played its home games in Nippert Stadium, as it has since 1923. This was Dantonio's last season with the Bearcats as he became head coach of Michigan State.

Schedule

Awards and milestones

Big East Conference honors

Offensive player of the week
Week 9: Dustin Grutza

Defensive player of the week
Week 8: Kevin McCullough
Week 12: DeAngelo Smith

Big East Conference All-Conference First Team
Terrill Byrd, DL
Kevin McCullough, LB
Dominic Ross, DB

Big East Conference All-Conference Second Team
Brent Celek, TE
Trevor Canfield, OL
Mike Mickens, DB

Players in the 2007 NFL Draft

References

Cincinnati
Cincinnati Bearcats football seasons
International Bowl champion seasons
Cincinnati Bearcats football